This is a list of child actors from Spain. Films and/or television series they appeared in are mentioned only if they were still a child at the time of filming.

Current child actors (under the age of eighteen) are indicated by boldface.

B 
Ivana Baquero (born 1994)
Romasanta (2004) 
Rottweiler (2004)
Fragile (2005)
Pan's Labyrinth (2006)

C 
 Guillermo Campra (born 1997)
 El Internado (2008 - 2009)
 Águila Roja (2009–Present)
 Carlitos y el campo de los sueños (2008)
Pablito Calvo (1948-2000)Miracle of Marcelino (1955)Uncle Hyacynth (1956)The Man Who Wagged His Tail (1957)Toto and Marcellino (1958)Juanito (1960)

 D 
 Nino del Arco (born 1958)
 A Fistful of Dollars (1964) as Jesus
 The Boy and the Ball and the Hole in the Wall (1965) as Dieter Smith
 La primera aventura (1965) as Pepín
 Grandes amigos (1967) as Nino Antonio
 La gran aventura (1969) as Juanito
 El niño y el potro (Más allá de río Miño) (1969) as Andresiño
 El Cristo del Océano (1971) as Pedrito
 Kalimán, el hombre increíble (1972) as Solín
 Code of Hunting (1983)
 Los ladrones van a la oficina (1994)

 J 
Joselito (born 1943)The Little Nightingale (1956)The Nightingale in the Mountains (1958)The Song of the Nightingale (1959)Listen to My Song (1959)The Little Colonel (1960)

M 
Marisol (born 1948)
A Ray of Light (1960)
An Angel Has Arrived (1961)
Tómbola (1961)
Marisol rumbo a Río (1963)

P 
Pili and Mili (born 1947)
Como dos gotas de agua (1963)

R 
 Antoñito Ruiz
 For a Few Dollars More (1965) as Fernando
 Dollars for a Fast Gun (1966)
 The Good, the Bad and the Ugly (1966) as Stevens' Youngest Son
 A Bullet for the General (1967) as Chico - Young Mexican at Train Station
 The Long Duel (1967) as Munnu
 Un día después de agosto (1968) as Folkloric Group Member
 Villa Rides (1968) as Juan
 Llego, veo, disparo (1968) as Postbag Carrier
 Massacre Harbor (1968) as Arab boy

T 
Ana Torrent (born 1966)
The Spirit of the Beehive (1973)
Cría Cuervos (1976)
Elisa, vida mía (1977)
The Nest (1980)

References

Spain
 
Actors, child
Spanish film-related lists